The Rouse the Believers Operations Room (also commonly translated as the And Incite the Believers Operations Room), was a coalition of Salafist jihadist insurgent groups in northwestern Syria during the Syrian Civil War.

Composition
The coalition included the Guardians of Religion Organization, Ansar al-Din Front, and Ansar al-Islam. All of the individual organizations in the group have rejected the Sochi agreement. Ansar al-Tawhid left the group on 3 May 2020.

History
On 24 October 2018, the operation room shelled multiple Syrian military positions in the town of Jurin in the Hama Governorate with SPG-9 recoilless guns. In response, the Syrian Army shelled a town controlled by the operation room 10 km north of Jurin. 

On 28 October 2018, the group published a video near al-Zahraa in the Aleppo Governorate of a sniping operation being carried out against pro-government militiamen.

On 27 November 2018, a video was released by the coalition showing fighters attacking government positions and gunning down pro-government militiamen in their quarters and taking their weapons.

On 27 August 2019, Rouse the Believers conducted a counter-offensive in southern Idlib targeting the Syrian government's positions near the town of Atshan. The Syrian Army reported repelling the attack shortly thereafter. Rebel forces reported taking over the villages of al-Salloumiyah, Sham al-Hawa, Tell Maraq and Al-Jaduiyah later in the day. SOHR confirmed that al-Sullaumiyah and Abu Omar had been recaptured by opposition forces and that some advances were made on Sham al-Hawa, while clashes over the rest of the villages continued. Later on the same day, SOHR reported that the rebel groups had withdrawn from the positions where they had taken earlier in the southeastern countryside of Idlib.

On 31 August 2019, the U.S. carried out a series of airstrikes on a Rouse the Believers meeting between Kafriya and Maarrat Misrin, killing over 40 Guardians of Religion Organization militants, including several leaders.

On 12 June 2020, member groups of the Rouse the Believers Operations Room, (excluding Ansar al-Tawhid who had a falling-out with the Guardians of Religion Organization) and in addition to two other Salafi jihadist groups (named al-Muqatileen al-Ansar Brigade and al-Jihad Coordination Group) led by former HTS commanders, reorganized themselves into a new operations room called "So Be Steadfast".

See also
 Army of Conquest 
 List of armed groups in the Syrian Civil War

References

External links
 Rouse the Believers's Telegram Channel

Anti-government factions of the Syrian civil war
2018 establishments in Syria
Jihadist groups in Syria
Operations rooms of the Syrian civil war
Salafi Jihadist groups